Mesopotamia is a town in eastern inland Saint Vincent, in Saint Vincent and the Grenadines. It is located to the southeast of Richland Park, and to the west of Peruvian Vale.

Notable people 
 Girlyn Miguel (born 1948), former MP and Deputy Prime Minister

References
Scott, C. R. (ed.) (2005) Insight guide: Caribbean (5th edition). London: Apa Publications.

Populated places in Saint Vincent and the Grenadines